The Northwest Power and Conservation Council is a regional organization that develops and maintains a regional power plan and a fish and wildlife program to balance the Northwest's environment and energy needs. Based in Portland, Oregon, the Council was created in 1980 when the U.S. Congress passed the Pacific Northwest Electric Power Planning and Conservation Act. The council's main task is to develop a 20-year electric power plan that will guarantee adequate and reliable energy at the lowest economic and environmental cost to the Northwest. Member states of the organization are Idaho, Montana, Oregon, and Washington.

Power plan
The council updates the 20-year electric power plan every five years. The process relies on broad public participation to inform the plan and build consensus on its recommendations. The plan generally targets energy efficiency and predicts that a large percentage of the new demand for electricity over the next 20 years in the Northwestern United States can be met by using energy more efficiently. The sixth plan was unanimously approved by the council on February 10, 2010.

Fish and wildlife
The council updates a fish and wildlife plan about every five years. As a planning, policy-making and reviewing body, the Council develops the program, and then monitors its implementation by the Bonneville Power Administration, the United States Army Corps of Engineers, the United States Bureau of Reclamation, and the Federal Energy Regulatory Commission and its licensees. The Northwest Power Act directs the council to develop its program and make periodic major revisions by first requesting recommendations from the region’s federal and state fish and wildlife agencies, appropriate Indian tribes (those within the basin) and other interested parties. The council also takes comment from designated entities and the public on those recommendations. The council then issues a draft amended program, initiating an extensive public comment period on the recommendations and proposed program amendments that includes extensive written comments, public hearings in each of the four states, and consultations with interested parties.

See also
 Western Climate Initiative
 The Climate Registry

References

External links
 Official page

United States interstate agencies
Organizations based in Portland, Oregon
Energy in Oregon
Organizations established in 1980
1980 establishments in Oregon